Jeevitha Nouka is a 1951 Malayalam-language film directed by K. Vembu and jointly produced by K. V. Koshi and Kunchako. It was the first "blockbuster cinema" in Malayalam cinema, with a theatrical run of 284 days. Made at a budget of  20000, this cinema did extremely well at the box office, such that very few cinemas could surpass it later.  It was simultaneously shot in Tamil and Telugu, and was dubbed and released in Hindi. This cinema portrayed the life of simple folk in a small village in Kerala. It stars Thikkurissy Sukumaran Nair and B. S. Saroja, with the latter making her debut and the former in his first major role. Its music is composed by V. Dakshinamoorthy and popular playback singer Mehboob debuted through this cinema. It is a remake of the Hindi cinema Jeevan Naiya with revised screenplay.

The Tamil version was titled Pichaikkaari and released on 18 May 1951. Vidwan P. Adhimoolan wrote the dialogues and lyrics. The song Vanaraniye enthan manaraniye sung by Thiruchi Loganathan and P. Leela was a popular number.

Cast

Malayalam 
Main cast
 Thikkurissy Sukumaran Nair as Soman
 B. S. Saroja as Lakshmi
 Adhimoolam as Kaniyan
 Pankajavalli as Janu, Raju's wife
 S. P. Pillai as Shanku, Janu's brother
 Nanukuttan as Zamindar
 Sebastian Kunjukunju Bhagavathar as Raju, Soman's elder brother
Supporting cast
 Ponnappan Arckatty as SI of Police
 Muthukulam Raghavan Pillai, Ambalappuzha Ravunni, Baby Girija, Jagadamma, Janamma, Mathappan, Mulavana, Soman Pillai.

Tamil 
Main cast
 Thikkurissy Sukumaran Nair as Soman
 Kunju Kunju Bhagavathar as Raju
 B. S. Saroja as Lakshmi
 Pankajavalli as Janu
 Adhimoolam as Kaniyar
 Muthukulam Raghavan Pillai as Lawyer
 S. P. Pillai as Shanku
 Mathappan as Kunju

Dance
 C. R. Rajakumari
 Indira Acharya
 B. S. Saroja
 Gopalakrishnan
 Balachandran

Soundtrack
V. Dakshinamoorthy composed the music for both Malayalam and Tamil versions. All the tunes for all the songs for both languages are the same with slight changes in playback singers.

Malayalam songs (Jeevitha Nouka)
Lyrics were penned by Abhayadev and Vallathol Narayana Menon. Playback singers are Thiruchi Loganathan, Ghantasala, Sebastian Kunjukunju Bhagavathar, V. Dakshinamoorthy, Mehboob, P. Leela, Alappuzha Pushpam and Kaviyoor Revamma.

Tamil songs (Pichaikkaari)
Lyrics were penned by P. Aadhimoolan. Playback singers are Thiruchi Loganathan, Ghantasala, Mehboob, P. Leela and Kaviyoor Revamma.

Box office
This film was a critical and commercial success and ran over 284 days in theatres. The film was screened in Kozhikode for 175 days and ran for 107 days in Ernakulam. 100 days have been completed in Kollam, Alappuzha, Kottayam, Kannur and Thrissur districts.

References

External links 
 
 Jeevitha Nouka at the Malayalam Movie Database

1950s Malayalam-language films
Indian black-and-white films
Indian drama films
1951 drama films